Baithurahma   (Malayalam: ബൈത്തു റഹ്മ, Arabic بیت الرحمة ('house of mercy') is a welfare scheme operating in Kerala, Andhra Pradesh, Uttar Pradesh, Tamil Nadu & Jharkhand. It is a housing project originally started by the IUML in Malappuram district to provide housing for poor people irrespective of community.

History 
Indian Union Muslim League Malappuram District committee originally planned to construct 20 houses for poor people in 2011 in memory of Panakkad Syed Muhammedali Shihab Thangal and named this project as “Baithu Rahma (House of Mercy). The overwhelmingly positive responses from the public and from within the party promoted the party to scale the programme up and extend it to other states.

Project completed 
Nearly 9,200 houses have been constructed in the state of Kerala, which include those built through Pravasi Baithu Rahma Scheme of IUML’s expatriates outfit Kerala Muslim Cultural Centre. Each house costs Rs 6.5 lakh-Rs 10 lakh. Baithurahma takes over every element of the organization

Criteria for approval 
The criteria for selection look beyond community or political affiliation. select beneficiaries based on economical status.

References

External links 
 ബൈത്തു റഹമയുടെ ശിലാസ്ഥാപനം നടന്നു
 പതിനായിരങ്ങൾക്ക് കാരുണ്യ ഭവനമൊരുക്കിയ ബൈത്തുറഹ്മ പദ്ധതി തുടങ്ങിയത് മലപ്പുറത്ത്; ചെന്ന...
 Muslim League plays key role of a trendsetter in humanitarian, environmental realms — Thangal
 എടയൂർ പത്താം വാർഡ് മുസ്ലിം ലീഗ്, യൂത്ത് ലീഗ് കമ്മറ്റികൾ സംയുക്തമായി നിർമ്മിച്ച ബൈത്തുറഹ്‌മയുടെ താക്കോൽ കൈമാറി
 മുസ്‌ലിംലീഗിന്റെ ബൈത്തുറഹ്മക്കെതിരെ ആഞ്ഞടിച്ച് സി.പി.എം.
 IUML gives house to Hapur lynch victim's family

Charities
Associations